The 1964 Gettysburg Bullets football team was an American football team that represented Gettysburg College during the 1964 NCAA College Division football season. The Bullets were champions of the Middle Atlantic Conference, University Division.

In their eighth year under head coach Eugene M. Haas, the Bullets compiled a 7–2 record. Ken Snyder and Mark Snyder were the team captains.

Following an upset win against top-ranked Delaware, its third in a row, the Bullets entered the UPI Small College Coaches Poll, ranked No. 10 in the nation. They moved up and down in the rankings until the end of the season, and were also considered a top contender for the Lambert Cup. A season-ending loss to Temple ruined their hopes of an undefeated conference record, however, and dropped Gettysburg out of the national top 20. The Lambert Cup instead went to division rival Bucknell.

Gettysburg went 5–1 against MAC University Division foes, the best winning percentage in the seven-team circuit. This was Gettysburg's only first-place finish during its 12-year tenure in the MAC University Division.

The Bullets played their home games at Memorial Field in Gettysburg, Pennsylvania. The October 24 game was their final game at this facility, which would be replaced the next year by Musselman Stadium.

Schedule

See also
 1966 Gettysburg Bullets football team, successor to this team that won the Lambert Cup.

References

Gettysburg
Gettysburg Bullets football seasons
Gettysburg Bullets football